Kateryna Oleksandrivna Derun (born 24 September 1993) is a Ukrainian athlete specialising in the javelin throw. Olympic Champion at the 1st youth Olympic Game in Singapore 2010. Silver Medalist at the European Championship U23 2015.
She competed at the 2015 World Championships in Beijing without qualifying for the final. In addition, she won the silver at the 2015 European U23 Championships. 2nd result in the Ukrainian javelin throw history at the Olympic Games. 

Her personal best in the event is 62.82 metres set in Kyiv on May 5, 2016.

Competition record

References

 

Ukrainian female javelin throwers
Living people
Place of birth missing (living people)
1993 births
World Athletics Championships athletes for Ukraine
Athletes (track and field) at the 2010 Summer Youth Olympics
Athletes (track and field) at the 2016 Summer Olympics
Olympic athletes of Ukraine
Olympic female javelin throwers
Youth Olympic gold medalists for Ukraine
Youth Olympic gold medalists in athletics (track and field)
21st-century Ukrainian women